Maréchal-des-logis Marcel Hauss was a French World War I flying ace credited with five aerial victories.

Biography
See also Aerial victory standards of World War I

Marcel Hauss was born in Paris on 31 July 1890.

He began his military service as a Cuirassier, but transferred to aviation in September 1915. He graduated from pilot training in mid-1916. On 10 December 1916, he was posted to Escadrille N.57. Between 27 December 1916 and 29 January 1917, he was confirmed to have helped shoot down five German airplanes, with a sixth victory going uncredited.

On 15 February 1917, he was shot down and killed while attacking a German two-seated reconnaissance aircraft above Saint-Mihiel.

Sources of information

Reference
 Franks, Norman; Bailey, Frank (1993). Over the Front: The Complete Record of the Fighter Aces and Units of the United States and French Air Services, 1914–1918 London, UK: Grub Street Publishing. .

1890 births
1917 deaths
French World War I flying aces
French military personnel killed in World War I